USS Tempest may refer to the following ships operated by the United States Navy:

 , a Civil War gunboat which served in the Mississippi River
 , a monitor renamed USS Yuma.
 , placed in 'Commission Special' status until December 2005, when she was formally commissioned as a Coast Guard Cutter. She was returned to the US Navy on 22 August 2008.

United States Navy ship names